John Vanderveken (born 4 February 1930) is a Belgian former trade union leader.

Life 
Born in Antwerp, Vanderveken's family were involved in trade unionism, and were friendly with Omer Becu.  They were also involved in the Belgian Resistance during World War II.

In 1951, Vanderveken began working for the International Confederation of Free Trade Unions (ICFTU), on the recommendation of Becu.  From 1956, he took time out to study at Ghent University, also working for the American labour attache.

Vanderveken returned to the ICFTU in 1960, working in the Economic and Social Policy Department, then in the organisation's Geneva office.  He proved successful, and in 1974 won election as the confederation's assistant general secretary.  In 1982, he was made acting general secretary of the ICFTU, and was elected to the post on a permanent basis in 1983.  He retired in 1992, becoming an adviser to the Education International.

References

1930 births
Living people
Belgian trade unionists
General Secretaries of the International Confederation of Free Trade Unions
Ghent University alumni
People from Antwerp